is a Japanese composer and musician known for her contributions in video games. Her best known soundtrack is Konami's Castlevania, which was also her debut work. She was co-credited with Satoe Terashima under the pseudonym James Banana for her work on the Nintendo Entertainment System version of the game. This pseudonym was a pun of the name James Bernard, the composer of the 1958 film Dracula.

Life
Yamashita was born in Amagasaki, Hyōgo, Japan. She began playing the piano at the age of four and took piano lessons as a child. After studying electronic engineering at the two-year college Osaka Electro-Communication University, she graduated in 1986 and went to work for Konami. After leaving Konami, Yamashita established a career as an independent composer. She moved to the United States in 2010, and currently resides in Montague, New Jersey.

Career
In 1986, Yamashita composed her first soundtrack to the video game Castlevania under strict hardware constraints. After her success in composing the Castlevania soundtrack, Yamashita composed for other games with Konami, including Esper Dream, Arumana no Kiseki, Stinger, Maze of Galious, Knightmare III: Shalom, and Parodius. She was part of the original Konami Kukeiha Club in-house band. In 1989, she left Konami to become a freelance composer.

As an independent composer, Yamashita continued to score soundtracks for video games, including Mega Man X3, but she also worked on various Natsume games, including Power Blade, the Medabot series, Zen-Nippon Pro Wrestling series, Bass Masters Classic (Game Boy Color), Power Rangers: Lightspeed Rescue (GBC), WWF WrestleMania 2000 (GBC), among others. Yamashita continued to compose independently in the new millennium, working on titles such as Buffy the Vampire Slayer (Game Boy Advance), Croc 2 (GBC), Monsters, Inc. (GBA), WWF Road to WrestleMania (GBA), Power Rangers: Dino Thunder (GBA), Keitai Denjū Telefang (GBC), and other games in the Medabot series.

From 1991 to 1995, Yamashita formed a duo ensemble called "Honey Honey" which performed live covers of American Pop and Jazz music. She played the piano, alto saxophone and sang background vocals. Yamashita also composed songs for Japanese artists under the independent label Rocketeers and R&B songs independently for American artists.

In 2009, Yamashita completed the arrangement for "Stage 4" on the Dodonpachi Dai-Ō-Jō remix CD released in Japan. She also composed a song for the Wii game Walk It Out. In September 2009, Yamashita was invited as a special guest to Video Games Live at their concert event in Tokyo, where she appeared on stage after a performance of Castlevania produced by Tommy Tallarico. In 2010 and 2011, she continued to make appearances with Video Games Live performing "Castlevania Rock" with orchestras at venues including NJPAC in New Jersey, the Tilles Center in New York City and the Nokia Theatre in Los Angeles.

Works
All works listed below were solely composed by Yamashita unless otherwise noted.

References

External links

 
Interview from Chapel of Resonance

Year of birth missing (living people)
Castlevania
Japanese composers
Japanese women composers
Konami people
Living people
Musicians from Hyōgo Prefecture
People from Amagasaki
People from Montague Township, New Jersey
Video game composers